St. Thomas Tommies is the nickname of the athletics teams at St. Thomas University (Canada) (STU) in Fredericton, New Brunswick. The name “Tommies” derives from the First World War, referring to a British soldier or “Tommy”. These soldiers would be called upon across no-mans-land, if German soldiers wished to speak to a British soldier. “Tommies” were known for their bravery and courage while travelling through the most dangerous grounds of the war. STU basically shares the campus with the University of New Brunswick and hence some of the facilities. The women's hockey teams is a member of the Atlantic University Sport. The basketball, soccer, volleyball, cross country and women's rugby teams are members of the Atlantic Colleges Athletic Association, while men's rugby compete in the Maritime University Rugby league.

Varsity sports

Ice hockey
In 2016, St. Thomas cut the men's hockey program citing financial difficulties. The St. Thomas (Canada) Tommies women's ice hockey program has competed in the 2014 CIS Women's Ice Hockey Championship (as host),  2016 and 2019 U Sports national women's ice hockey championships. Team captain and blueliner Kelty Apperson would graduate to professional hockey, winning the 2019 Clarkson Cup with the Calgary Inferno.

Other sports
Basketball
Soccer
Volleyball
Rugby
Cross Country
Track

Athletes of the Year

References

St. Thomas (Canada) Tommies